Salvatore Fontana (Venice, c. 1550s - 1590) was an Italian painter of the Renaissance period, a minor pupil of Cesare Nebbia active mainly in Rome.

Biography
He worked under Nebbia in the Sistine Chapel in Santa Maria Maggiore, Rome in Rome.

References

1550s births
1590 deaths
16th-century Italian painters
Italian male painters
Italian Renaissance painters